Burton Lorne Cummings  (born December 31, 1947) is a Canadian musician. He is best known for leading The Guess Who during that band's most successful period from 1965 to 1975, and for a lengthy solo career.

Cummings has been inducted into the Canadian Music Industry Hall of Fame and the Canadian Songwriters Hall of Fame, and has been cited as one of the most influential performers in Canadian rock music. He has also been named as an officer of the Order of Canada and Order of Manitoba. The Burton Cummings Theatre and Burton Cummings Community Centre in Winnipeg are named in his honour.

Career

Early years 
Cummings was born and raised in Winnipeg by his mother and maternal grandparents, after his father left the family during his infancy. He attended St. John's High School but dropped out at age 17 to pursue a career in music; the school granted him an honorary diploma in 2010. 

In 1964 Cummings joined local R&B band the Deverons (not to be confused with an American group called the Devrons) on piano and vocals. The Deverons released two singles locally in Winnipeg. In early 1966, shortly after his 18th birthday, Cummings joined another regionally successful band, Chad Allan & The Expressions, to replace departed keyboardist Bob Ashley. Cummings also took on lead vocal duties in conjunction with group leader Chad Allan.

This group had been subjected to a record company publicity stunt in which their 1965 hit single "Shakin' All Over" was released anonymously with the message "Guess Who?" to trick listeners into thinking it was by a famous British Invasion band. Disc jockeys announced the single as being by someone called "Guess Who?", forcing the group to accept the nickname; their latest releases had been issued under the name Chad Allan & The Expressions with "Guess Who?" displayed prominently on the covers.

With The Guess Who 

Just a few months after Cummings joined Chad Allan & The Expressions, Allan left his namesake band, leaving Cummings as the sole singer. The band's name was changed to simply The Guess Who, with Cummings becoming one of the band's primary songwriters in conjunction with guitarist Randy Bachman. Their first album under this name was It's Time in the summer of 1966. 

The band became internationally successful upon the release of their album American Woman in 1970, which reached the top ten in several countries and made The Guess Who the first Canadian band to achieve a number one single in the United States. Bachman then left The Guess Who, and Cummings continued to lead the band through several more internationally successful albums. Cummings and drummer Garry Peterson were the only consistent members of the band during this era. Cummings disbanded The Guess Who in 1975 due to songwriting disagreements with guitarist Dominic Troiano.

Solo career 
After leaving The Guess Who, Cummings embarked on a solo career; his self-titled debut solo album was released in 1976 and reached the top ten on the Canadian albums chart. The single "Stand Tall" was an international hit and sold more than one million copies in the United States. In 1977 he was presented with a Juno Award as best male vocalist. Also in 1977 he provided backing vocals for the Eric Carmen album Boats Against the Current, and released his second solo album My Own Way to Rock.

His 1978 album Dream of a Child sold more than three million copies in Canada, making it one of the country's highest-selling albums up to that point. Due to a dispute with his record label, his 1980 album Woman Love was not released in the United States but was another substantial hit in Canada that earned Cummings another Juno Award. The 1981 album Sweet Sweet was much less successful. Cummings also dabbled in acting during this period, with an appearance in the film Melanie in 1982. Cummings joined a short reunion tour of the classic Guess Who lineup in 1983, which resulted in the live album Together Again! (known as The Best of The Guess Who - Live! in the United States). The solo albums Heart (1984) and Plus Signs (1990) were moderately successful in Canada.

After an extended break from recording, Cummings released the live album Up Close and Alone in 1997, featuring songs from throughout his career performed on solo piano. Cummings then convened another reunion of The Guess Who for an extensive nostalgia tour from 2000 to 2003. In July 2003 the group performed before an estimated audience of 450,000 at the Molson Canadian Rocks for Toronto SARS benefit concert. The show was the largest outdoor ticketed event in Canadian history.

In 2004, Cummings released the one-off single "With God on Our Side", a Bob Dylan cover, which reached no. 29 on the Canadian singles chart. In 2006, Cummings and Randy Bachman started a new duo project backed by the Canadian rock band The Carpet Frogs, but were unable to use the name The Guess Who, which had been trademarked by bassist Jim Kale. The project became known as the Bachman-Cummings Band or simply Bachman-Cummings, and performs occasionally whenever both men are available. They released the covers album Jukebox in 2007 and most recently performed live in 2020. They have been selected to perform for a celebration of Manitoba's 150th anniversary, to take place after delays caused by the COVID-19 pandemic.

The Carpet Frogs have also served as Cummings's solo band. In 2008, Cummings released his first all-new solo album in 18 years, Above the Ground. In 2017 he released a book of poetry titled The Writings of B. L. Cummings, which sold successfully in Canada. He returned to solo performances in 2019, with shows featuring cover songs and original songs from throughout his career with The Guess Who and as a solo artist.

Awards 

Throughout his career, Cummings has won five  RPM Awards, six Juno Awards, 22  SOCAN Awards, three BMI America Awards, and a Genie Award.

In 2001, Cummings and the rest of The Guess Who received honourary doctorates from Manitoba's Brandon University, which Cummings considered a singular honour as a high school dropout. That year Cummings also won three SOCAN Classic Awards. 

On December 30, 2009, Cummings was named an officer of the Order of Canada by Governor General Michaëlle Jean, to mark a lifetime of outstanding achievement, dedication to community, and service to the nation. On June 28, 2011, Cummings was awarded with a star on Canada's Walk of Fame; he had previously received a star as a member of The Guess Who in 2001. He was inducted into the Canadian Music Hall of Fame in 2016, and received a SOCAN lifetime achievement award in 2018.

Personal life 
Cummings married Cheryl DeLuca on September 22, 1981. He has never had any children. He lived in Sherman Oaks, California, for many years until moving to Moose Jaw, Saskatchewan, in 2017. He is part owner of the Winnipeg-based restaurant chain Salisbury House. In May 2018 he was involved in a serious car accident in Los Angeles, requiring physical and mental therapy and the cancellation of several weeks of performances.

Discography

Albums

Singles

Film Music 
California Dreaming (1978)
"Among the Yesterdays" (Music by Fred Karlin / Lyrics by Robb Royer)
"Keep it in the Family" (Music and Lyric by Cummings)
Voices (1979)
"I Will Always Wait For You (Theme From Voices)" (Written by Jimmy Webb)
"On a Stage" (Written by Jimmy Webb)
"Drunk as a Punk" (Written by Jimmy Webb)
Melanie (1982)
"You Saved My Soul" (Written by Cummings)
"Real Good" (Written by Cummings)
"Something Old, Something New" (Written by Cummings)

Collaborations with Randy Bachman 
 2006 Bachman-Cummings Songbook – Compilation that features tracks from The Guess Who, Burton Cummings and Bachman–Turner Overdrive
 2006 The Thunderbird Trax – A compilation of previously unreleased material recorded by Bachman and Cummings circa 1987
 2007 Jukebox – Bachman & Cummings album that features covers of songs by artists such as Bob Dylan, The Shadows and The Beatles

See also 

Canadian rock
Music of Canada
Bruce Robb (producer)

References

External links
 Official website
 
 Burton Cummings Theatre at the Internet Broadway Database
 
 Burton Cummings Biography CanConRox entry at CanadianBands.com

1947 births
Living people
Officers of the Order of Canada
Members of the Order of Manitoba
Musicians from Winnipeg
Canadian male singer-songwriters
Canadian country singer-songwriters
Canadian rock keyboardists
Canadian rock pianists
Canadian rock guitarists
Canadian male guitarists
Canadian rock singers
Canadian soft rock musicians
Juno Award for Album of the Year winners
Best Original Song Genie and Canadian Screen Award winners
The Guess Who members
Juno Award for Artist of the Year winners
Juno Award for Breakthrough Artist of the Year winners
20th-century Canadian male singers
21st-century Canadian male singers
20th-century Canadian guitarists
21st-century Canadian guitarists
20th-century Canadian pianists
21st-century Canadian pianists
Canadian male pianists
20th-century Canadian keyboardists
Writers from Winnipeg
Ringo Starr & His All-Starr Band members
Canadian Music Hall of Fame inductees